Raireshwar fort is in Bhor taluka near Pune, India,  away.  It is between various hills and forts such as Kenjalgad. In the Maratha Empire age it was a significant fort.

Rairashwar is known for its seven coloured soil (mine with seven colour rocks which made this soil) which has evoked the interest of geologists.

Raireshwar is the birthplace of Swarajya. Chhatrapati Shivaji Maharaj, took the oath of foundation of ‘Hindavi Swarajya’ at Shri Raireshwar temple on Chaitra Shu. Saptami in 1645 along with his companion Mavalas against the foreign invasive dynasties of that time.

Temple
Raireshwar has a temple famous for its historical importance. The temple is very old and of stone structure, but it was later re-constructed in the 18th century. The temple is on a plateau, which has many beautiful flowers during monsoon, the best time to visit this place.

Chhatrapati Shivaji Maharaj, took the oath of foundation of ‘Hindavi Swarajya’ at Shri Raireshwar temple on Chaitra Shu. Saptami in 1645 along with his companion Mavalas against the invasive foreign dynasties of that time. Hence Raireshwar holds special importance as the origin of Hindavi Swarajya.

Tourism
The Raireshwar plateau in Pune's Bhor Taluka is renowned for its historical significance and is a popular tourist and trekking destination in Maharashtra. The location is easily reachable by private or public transportation and is 80 kilometres from Pune. In Raireshwar fort camping is available. The places worth visiting in Raireshwar are Raireshwar Mandir, Gomukh Lake, Nakhinda (also known as Aswal Lake) and Pandavleni.

References

External links

Cities and towns in Pune district
Tourist attractions in Pune district